Lucy-Anne Bradshaw is a British actress and singer, known for playing Cathy in the original production of Whistle Down the Wind by National Youth Music Theatre and Miss Kenton in the musical adaptation of The Remains of the Day. She also played Terry in Merrily We Roll Along directed by Michael Grandage at the Donmar Warehouse in December 2000, which won the 2001 Laurence Olivier Award for Best New Musical.

Background
Lucy-Anne Bradshaw was born in Bristol. She attended St Mary Redcliffe and Temple School played many leading roles with the National Youth Music Theatre and won the Cameron Mackintosh Award in 1997. Lucy trained at Webber Douglas Academy of Dramatic Art.

Career
Lucy began her career creating/playing roles such as Cathy in the Original musical play Whistle Down the Wind for National Youth Music Theatre in Richard Taylor and Russell Labey's musical adaption. She went on to play a role in Merrily We Roll Along at the Donmar Warehouse directed by Michael Grandage and played the part of Gertrude Lawrence in Noel and Gertie at The Salisbury Playhouse. Bradshaw played the part of Miss Kenton in The Remains of the Day, the musical adaption of the Booker Prize winning novel by Kazuo Ishiguro.

Theatre

References

External links
Official website

Alumni of the Webber Douglas Academy of Dramatic Art
English stage actresses
Living people
Year of birth missing (living people)
Actresses from Bristol